Keryeh Sheykh Ali Khodadad (also Romanized as Keryeh Sheykh ʿAlī Khodādād; also known as Keryeh 3 and Khodādād) is a village in Teshkan Rural District, Chegeni District, Dowreh County, Lorestan Province, Iran. At the 2006 census, its population was 82, in 16 families.

References 

Towns and villages in Dowreh County